Sharon Lee 李昊嘉 (born 21 April 1988 in Hong Kong) is a Hong Kong singer.

Biography
Sharon Lee was a contestant in the first season of Asian Millionstar, and first gained publicity after performing a cover of 電燈膽 by Stephy Tang. The video of her cover received almost 100,000 hits on YouTube overnight. While she was still competing in Asian Millionstar, she debuted with her first song 萬歲師表 in 2009. She had also auditioned for The Voice on Television Broadcasts Limited (TVB), but did not make it to the 100 finalists.

Sharon Lee graduated from HKIED with a Bachelor of Music in Education(Hons) and a Master of Music in Education in 2011 and 2012 respectively. Lee has achieved LTCL Piano Recital and ABRSM Theory of Music Grade 8 and is now a singing and piano instructor.

On December 1, 2010, Lee's debut single album EP-Give it a Go (EP) was released.

Music career

Pre-Asian Millionstar

Asian Millionstar (Season 1)

Gallery

Discography
(Asia Millionstar)《亞洲星光大道》
 Release Date:01/03/2010
 Tracks: 6. 愛上癮 (duet with Raymond Seen)7. 星光熠熠 (chorus with the finalists)9. 寫一首歌 (chorus with Season 1 contestants)10. 謝謝你 (chorus with Season 1 contestants)
 Label: Asia Television
 Notes: Compilation album with other Asian Millionstar Season 1 contestants
《Give it a Go (EP)》
 Release Date: 01/12/2010
 Tracks:1. Prelude (Cello Trio)2. 開一扇窗3. 捨棄4. 回味5. 小寵愛6. What a wonderful world

《Enchantment》
 Release Date: 21/7/2012
 Tracks:1. 情書2. Vincent3. 細訴4. 追5. 回頭6. 模稜兩可7. 珍惜8.開一扇窗9. 捨棄10. 回味

Concerts

Music videos

Filmography

Television (ATV)
第一屆《亞洲星光大道》 Asian Millionstar (2009): Contestant

Law Week 2009 Opening (2009): Guest performance

Housemen: Guest

Asia Millionstar (Season 2) (2010): Guest performance, challenger

The 15th Annual Most Popular TV Commercial Award: Guest performance

Asia Millionstar (Season 3) (2010): Guest performance, challenger

Starry Night (2010): Guest

After 11PM (2011): Host & Guest

Books
 July 2010 – 星光一班 (Asian Millionstar Season 1)

References

 Apple Daily article (Chinese),2010/04/19
 The-Sun article (Chinese),2010/04/19
 Yahoo article (Chinese),2010/04/19
 Singpao article (Chinese),2010/04/19
 Apple Daily article (Chinese),2010/08/19
 Oriental Daily article (Chinese),2011/01/04
 Oriental Daily article (Chinese),2011/04/29

External links

 Sharon Lee Official Website 李昊嘉官方網站
 Asia Television Limited Official Website
 Sharon Lee International Fan Club 李昊嘉國際歌迷會
 Sharon Lee International Fan Club Forum 李昊嘉國際歌迷會論壇
 李昊嘉新浪微博
 李昊嘉部落格
 李昊嘉國際歌迷會官方新浪微博

1988 births
Cantonese-language singers
Cantopop singers
21st-century Hong Kong women singers
Living people